Scopelobates is a genus of tarantulas containing the single species, Scopelobates sericeus. It was  first described by Eugène Simon in 1903, and is only found in Dominican Republic.

References

Monotypic Theraphosidae genera
Theraphosidae